The Smith, later Prince-Smith Baronetcy, of Hillbrook in the County of York, was a title in the Baronetage of the United Kingdom. It was created on 11 February 1911 for Prince Smith, head of Prince-Smith and Stells, textile engineers, of Keighley, West Yorkshire. The second Baronet assumed the additional surname of Prince. The title became extinct on the death of the fourth Baronet in 2007.

Smith, later Prince-Smith baronets, of Hillbrook (1911)
Sir Prince Smith, 1st Baronet (1840–1922)
Sir Prince Prince-Smith, 2nd Baronet (1869–1940)
Sir William Prince-Smith, 3rd Baronet (1898–1964).
Sir William Richard Prince-Smith, 4th Baronet (1928–2007)

References

Extinct baronetcies in the Baronetage of the United Kingdom